Formicini is a tribe of ants in the subfamily Formicinae.

Genera
 Alloformica Dlussky, 1969
 Bajcaridris Agosti, 1994
 Cataglyphis Foerster, 1850
 †Cataglyphoides Dlussky, 2008
 †Conoformica Dlussky, 2008
 Formica Linnaeus, 1758
 Iberoformica Tinaut, 1990
 Polyergus Latreille, 1804 – Amazon ants
 Proformica Ruzsky, 1902
 †Protoformica Dlussky, 1967
 Rossomyrmex Arnol'di, 1928

References

Formicinae
Ant tribes
Taxa named by Pierre André Latreille